Ronald Russell (born June 10, 1954) is a sprinter who represents the United States Virgin Islands. He competed in the 100 metres at the 1976 Summer Olympics and the 1984 Summer Olympics.

References

1954 births
Living people
Athletes (track and field) at the 1971 Pan American Games
Athletes (track and field) at the 1975 Pan American Games
Athletes (track and field) at the 1976 Summer Olympics
Athletes (track and field) at the 1979 Pan American Games
Athletes (track and field) at the 1984 Summer Olympics
United States Virgin Islands male sprinters
Olympic track and field athletes of the United States Virgin Islands
Pan American Games competitors for the United States Virgin Islands
Place of birth missing (living people)